The Green Jade is a crane vessel built to support the offshore wind industry.

Design 
Green Jade is 216.5m long. Its main crane capacity is 4,000 tonnes. Crew accommodations are for up to 160. The main crane is made by Huisman Equipment.

Naming 
Green Jade is named after Yu Shan, the tallest mountain in Taiwan.

History 
Green Jade was built at CSBC Corporation, Taiwan's Kaohsiung yard. First steel was cut in September 2020 and the keel was laid in March 2021.

Green Jade'''s launching in April 2022 was attended by Taiwanese Premier Su Tseng-chang. At the time of its launching it was the second largest vessel of its kind in the world.Green Jade'' is owned by CSBC-DEME Wind Engineering Co.

References 

Crane vessels
Ships built in the Republic of China
Wind power in Taiwan